Francisco de Paula Brochado da Rocha (8 August 1910 – 26 September 1962) was a Brazilian counsel, professor and politician.

He was the son of the former mayor Porto Alegre, Otavio Rocha and Rocha Inácia, brother Antonio da Rocha and José Diogo da Rocha. While still a student, participated in the Revolution of 1930, when he was wounded during the assault on the headquarters of the Third Army, Rua da Praia, in Porto Alegre, on October 3. Due to injury, he lost a leg and started using a mechanical prosthesis.

In 1932, he graduated from the Law School of Porto Alegre, which now belongs to the Federal University of Rio Grande do Sul, where he was later Professor of Constitutional Law.

It was the city attorney of Porto Alegre, state deputy elected by the PSD for the 38th Legislature of the Legislative Assembly of Rio Grande do Sul, from 1947 to 1951.

He was proprietor of the state departments of Education and Culture, and the Interior and Justice, during the government Brizola in Rio Grande do Sul participated actively in the campaign of the Legality in 1961, making the connection between the government and Brizola nationalist sectors of the Third Army that would support the movement that secured the possession of João Goulart, after the resignation of Jânio Quadros.

At the federal level, was a consultant of the Republic, a member of the Federal Council of Education, Minister of Finance and Chairman of the Council of Ministers (July 12, 1962 to September 18, 1962) during the brief parliamentary regime that followed the inauguration of João Goulart. As chairman, he worked for short parliamentary experience now seen as virtually doomed. He died eight days after leaving office.

References

1910 births
1962 deaths
Prime Ministers of Brazil
Finance Ministers of Brazil
20th-century Brazilian lawyers